Satpara Dam is a medium-size multi-purpose concrete-faced earth-filled dam located downstream from Satpara Lake on the Satpara Stream approximately 4 km from the town of Skardu in Gilgit-Baltistan, Pakistan.

The dam has enlarged the size of Satpara Lake, generates 17.36 MW of hydroelectricity, supplies power to approximately 30,000 households in the Skardu Valley, irrigates  of land and supplies 3.1 million gallons per day of drinking water to Skardu city. Annual agricultural output in the Skardu Valley is expected to increase more than four-fold, generating about $6 million in additional annual economic benefits to local communities.

Construction of Satpara Dam commenced in April 2003 and completion was scheduled in November 2011. Power House Unit No. 1 was completed and came online on 6 October 2007 and Unit No. 2 was completed and came online on 30 December 2008. On 7 January 2011, the Government of Pakistan and the United States Agency for International Development (USAID) entered into an Enhanced Partnership Agreement under which USAID agreed to provide US$26 million for the construction of Power House Units Nos. 3 and 4 and completion of the remaining works on the dam. Power House Unit No. 3 started commercial operation in May 2013 and Unit No. 4 started commercial operation in June 2013.

The dam became operational in April 2013.

Salient features 

Dam:
Type: Earth-filled
Length: 560 ft.
Height: 128 ft.
Width (at top): 80 ft.

Spillway:
Spillway length: 1,075 ft.
Spillway width: 50 ft.
Spillway capacity: 5000 ft 3/s

Reservoir capacity (gross): 0.0932 MAF (93,385 AF) 
Reservoir capacity (live): 0.0521 MAF (51,484 AF) 
Power generation capacity: 17.366 MW 
Irrigation system: LBC 51933 ft., RBC 58000 ft.

Canal Length:
Left Bank Canal: 59,000 Ft.
Right Bank Canal : 30,000 Ft.

Command Area:
Total: 
Left Bank Canal: 
Right Bank Canal: 

Construction:
Contractor: hi tech lubricants Ltd.
Man-hours: 2.4 million
Peak manpower: 450

See also 

 List of dams and reservoirs in Pakistan
 Satpara Lake
 Satpara Stream
 List of power stations in Pakistan
 Allai Khwar Hydropower Project
 Gomal Zam Dam

References

External links
 WAPDA Project Details

Dams in Pakistan
Dams completed in 2011
Hydroelectric power stations in Pakistan
Embankment dams
Dams in Gilgit-Baltistan